In cryptography, most public key cryptosystems are founded on problems that are believed to be intractable.  The higher residuosity problem (also called the n th-residuosity problem) is one such problem.  This problem is easier to solve than integer factorization, so the assumption that this problem is hard to solve is stronger than the assumption that integer factorization is hard.

Mathematical background
If n is an integer, then the integers modulo n form a ring.  If n=pq where p and q are primes, then the Chinese remainder theorem tells us that

From the isomorphism above, we have

as an isomorphism of groups. If d is a divisor of p-1, then the set of dth powers in  form a subgroup of index d.
quadratic residues (when n is the product of exactly two primes, as it is here).

The important point is that for any divisor d of p-1 (or q-1) the set of dth powers forms a subgroup of

Problem statement
Given an integer n = pq where p and q are unknown, an integer d such that d divides p-1, and an integer x < n, it is infeasible to determine whether x is a dth power (equivalently dth residue) modulo n.

Notice that if p and q are known it is easy to determine whether x is a dth residue modulo n because x will be a dth residue modulo p if and only if

When d=2, this is called the quadratic residuosity problem.

Applications
The semantic security of the Benaloh cryptosystem and the Naccache–Stern cryptosystem rests on the intractability of this problem.

References

Computational number theory
Computational hardness assumptions